Eslam Jahedi (born 1 January 1979) is a member of the Iranian National Team for Para Canoe.

About 
At the age of 9 months, Jahedi suffered from a complication of the left leg and a small part of his right leg. However, he was very interested in sports since childhood. In 1991, he officially became a member of the Hormozgan Province Wheelchair Basketball Team, and after 6 years, he was called to the camp of the senior national team as the youngest wheelchair basketball player in the country. Jahedi was one of the few athletes who participated as a legionnaire in the clubs of other provinces and to this day, as the captain of the Hormozgan province wheelchair basketball team, he has been active in the field of basketball professionally by winning dozens of different titles in championships and clubs. Continues.

In the same years, he started the track and field for the disabled in sprint and wheelchair throwing events, and in the country's youth championships he won a silver medal in javelin throwing, a 100-meter gold medal in wheelchair and a 400-meter silver medal in wheelchair racing.

Jahedi turned to para canoe in 2011. He won first place in the national championship and national team selection that year and became a member of the national team. He has been able to win all the national championships to date.

From 2014 to 2019, he participated in all the World and Asian Championships.

In 2016, the German World Championship para olympic qualifiers won the second place in the final B (11th in the world And failed to become a member of the top ten in the world and qualify for the Rio 2016 para olympic. He has won various titles in all Asian Championships.

In 2019, he competed in the Hungarian World Championships and the qualifiers 2021 para olympic Games in Tokyo in both kayak and canoe, and was able to win a continental quota in the canoe for the disabled, provided that the same title was used at the 2021 World Championships in Hungry. And even a better position can lead to the biggest sporting event in the world (para olympic).

He holds equivalent a Ph.D. in Sports Management

References

External links 
 Eslam Jahedi (IRI) Para Canoe

1979 births
Living people
Iranian male canoeists